Kenya competed at the 2008 Summer Paralympics in Beijing. The country's delegation consisted of thirteen competitors captained by three-time Paralympic gold medalist Henry Wanyoike. Also on the team was javelin thrower Mary Nakhumicha. Wanyoike competed in the 5000 metres, 10000 metres, and the marathon.

Medallists

Athletics

Men's track

Men's field

Women's track

Women's field

Powerlifting

Men

See also 
 Kenya at the Paralympics
 Kenya at the 2008 Summer Olympics

External links 
 Beijing 2008 Paralympic Games Official Site
 International Paralympic Committee

References 

Nations at the 2008 Summer Paralympics
2008
Paralympics